Irina Mironenko is a former pair skater who competed internationally for the Soviet Union. With partner Dmitri Shkidchenko, she is the 1985 and 1986 World Junior silver medalist.

Results 
(with Shkidchenko)

References

Soviet female pair skaters
Living people
World Junior Figure Skating Championships medalists
Year of birth missing (living people)